This is a list of defunct airlines of Lebanon.

See also
 List of airlines of Lebanon
 List of airports in Lebanon

References

Lebanon
Airlines
Airlines, defunct